Prolaz  (Cyrillic: Пролаз) is a village in the municipality of Novo Goražde, Republika Srpska, Bosnia and Herzegovina. The name Prolaz can be translated from Bosnian to English to mean passage.

References

Populated places in Novo Goražde